Otomitl (From Nahuatl, 'Jute bone' or 'Where the otomies are') is one of the six giants sons of Iztac-Mixcoatl and Tlaltecuhtli that populated the Earth after the Great Flood during the Fifth Sun in Aztec mythology. The sixth son who climbed the mountains near Mexico, and raised the populations of Xilotepec, Tollan, and Otompan.

References 

Aztec legendary creatures
Native American giants